Leslie Richardson (5 September 1911 – 1 November 1981) was an Australian cricketer. He played nine first-class matches for Tasmania between 1928 and 1932.

See also
 List of Tasmanian representative cricketers

References

External links
 

1911 births
1981 deaths
Australian cricketers
Tasmania cricketers
Cricketers from Hobart